Julian Seward is a British compiler writer and Free Software contributor who lives in Stuttgart.  He is commonly known for creating the bzip2 compression tool in 1996, as well as the valgrind memory debugging toolset founded in 2000. In 2006, he won a second O'Reilly Open Source Award for his work on Valgrind.

Julian currently works at Mozilla.

Contributions 
 bzip2 (1996), a data compressor
 cacheprof (1999), a tool for locating the sources of D-cache misses
 Valgrind, a memory debugger

Awards 
 July 2006 Julian Seward won a Google-O'Reilly Open Source Award for "Best Toolmaker" for his work on Valgrind

References

External links 
 Interview with Valgrind Author Julian Seward on techrepublic.com, January 2004.
 Interview with Valgrind Author Julian Seward on kde.org, February 2006.

English computer programmers
Living people
Free software programmers
Open source people
Year of birth missing (living people)